Actiniopteris is a fern genus in the subfamily Pteridoideae of the family Pteridaceae.

Species
The Plant List and Tropicos recognise 5 accepted species:
 Actiniopteris australis 
 Actiniopteris dichotoma  
 Actiniopteris dimorpha 
 Actiniopteris radiata 
 Actiniopteris semiflabellata

References

Pteridaceae
Fern genera